Wilmott Magazine is a mathematical finance and risk management magazine, combining technical articles with humor pieces. Each copy of Wilmott is 11 inches square, runs about 100 pages, and is printed on glossy paper. The magazine has the highest subscription price of any magazine.

Content and contributors
Wilmott has a section with technical articles on mathematical finance, but includes quantitative financial comic strips, and lighter articles.

Wilmott magazine's regular contributors include Edward Thorp, Espen Gaarder Haug, Aaron Brown, William Ziemba, Nassim Taleb, Henriette Prast, Kent Osband, Satyajit Das, Babak Mahdavi-Damghani, Pat Hagan, Dave Ingram, Elie Ayache, Milford Radley, Jean-Philippe Bouchaud and Jan Darasz.

History
The magazine was launched in 1999 in London. The publishers are Wiley Publishing and editor in chief Paul Wilmott. The magazine's target audience is people working with quantitative finance in hedge fund, investment banks, risk management and professional investment management firms.

References

External links
 Wilmott Magazine
  Portfolio magazine reportage on Wilmott Magazine and Paul Wilmott
 Interview with Paul Wilmott New York Times

Bi-monthly magazines published in the United Kingdom
Business magazines published in the United Kingdom
Magazines published in London
Magazines established in 1999
1999 establishments in the United Kingdom